Josh Currie (born October 29, 1992) is a Canadian professional ice hockey forward currently playing under contract to Metallurg Magnitogorsk of the Kontinental Hockey League (KHL).

Playing career
Undrafted, Josh Currie played major junior hockey with the Prince Edward Island Rocket of the Quebec Major Junior Hockey League (QMJHL). Currie was rewarded for his outstanding play during the 2012–13 QMJHL season by being named to the QMJHL's First All-Star Team.

Josh Currie made his professional debut in the ECHL with the Gwinnett Gladiators before signing for his second season in the ECHL with the Bakersfield Condors on August 27. 2014.

In 2015, the Edmonton Oilers moved their American Hockey League franchise to become the Bakersfield Condors and the ECHL Condors team was displaced. On August 19, 2015, Currie continued with the former ECHL Condors' franchise, agreeing to a one-year deal with the now relocated Norfolk Admirals in the ECHL. He signed a two-year AHL contract to return to Bakersfield with the AHL Condors on July 6, 2017.

On July 19, 2018, after impressing in each of his three seasons with the Condors, Currie was signed to his first NHL contract in agreeing to a two-year, two-way contract with the Edmonton Oilers. He earned his first NHL recall by the Oilers on February 18, 2019.

On October 9, 2020, having left the Oilers organization, Currie was signed to a one-year, two-way contract with the Pittsburgh Penguins. Currie made 1 appearance with the Penguins during the pandemic delayed 2020–21 season, before he was reassigned for the remainder of the campaign, to captain AHL affiliate, the Wilkes-Barre/Scranton Penguins.

At the conclusion of the season Currie left the Penguins organization as an impending free agent and signed a one-year contract with Russian club, Metallurg Magnitogorsk of the KHL, on June 11, 2021.

Career statistics

Regular season and playoffs

International

Awards and honours

References

External links

1992 births
Bakersfield Condors (1998–2015) players
Bakersfield Condors players
Canadian ice hockey right wingers
Edmonton Oilers players
Gwinnett Gladiators players
Ice hockey people from Prince Edward Island
Living people
Metallurg Magnitogorsk players
Norfolk Admirals (ECHL) players
P.E.I. Rocket players
Pittsburgh Penguins players
Sportspeople from Charlottetown
Undrafted National Hockey League players
Wilkes-Barre/Scranton Penguins players